State Highway 53 is an  highway in southern Oklahoma. It connects Walters in Cotton County to Gene Autry in Carter County. It has one lettered spur route, SH-53A, a spur route to Gene Autry.

Route description
SH-53 begins at a T intersection in Walters, where State Highway 5 makes up the western and southern legs of the T. SH-53 runs eastward from here, crossing East Cache Creek. At Fivemile Corner, the road intersects SH-65, five miles (8 km) east of Walters. SH-53 continues due east into the Waurika Wildlife Management Area, where it crosses Beaver Creek and Little Beaver Creek (which at their confluence downstream of SH-53 are dammed to create Waurika Lake). After leaving the wildlife management area, SH-53 crosses into Stephens County.

The highway continues due east to the western outskirts of Comanche, where it curves northeast to pass through the city's downtown. There, it intersects US-81. SH-53 continues due east out of town as it approaches Comanche Lake, where it cuts away to the southeast before resuming its due east course. The highway then goes through a series of curves gradually sending it more southeast, passing through Loco. The route serves as the northern terminus for SH-89 just before crossing into Carter County.

The first highway junction that SH-53 encounters in Carter County begins a three-mile (5 km) concurrency with State Highway 76 north of Healdton. South of Fox, SH-53 splits off to the east. The highway passes through Clemscott, Graham, Milo, and Woodford before coming to an interchange with I-35. SH-53 joins southbound I-35, splitting off after two miles (3 km). It meets US-77 in Springer before passing through Gene Autry and ending at US-177.

SH-53A

State Highway 53A is a one-mile (1.6 km) spur to Gene Autry. It begins at SH-53 near the entrance to the Ardmore Air Park, in northeastern Carter County.  It is a narrow, two-lane state highway with no shoulders throughout its length in and around the town of Gene Autry.  The road has an at-grade crossing with the Burlington Northern & Santa Fe railroad at the north end of Gene Autry, and the road continues through the town until it reaches its terminus at the southern grade crossing of the same railway.

Former SH-53A

Another State Highway 53A was once a spur route to Comanche Lake. It was officially removed from the state highway system by action of the Transportation Commission on February 2, 2004.

Junction list

References

External links
SH-53 at OKHighways

053
Transportation in Cotton County, Oklahoma
Transportation in Stephens County, Oklahoma
Transportation in Carter County, Oklahoma